Elena Nefedeva (born August 1870, Halahalnya, Russian Empire) was a Russian Greco-Roman Catholic nun.

Biography
Nefedeva was born in August 1870 in a Lutheran peasant family in the Halahalnya village, Pskov Oblast. She graduated from high school in Pskov. She married a court counselor. After the death of her husband she moved to Petrograd, where she was arrested  on 26 September 1918, and released on 2 October.

In late 1921, Nefedeva adopted Eastern Catholicism and became a parishioner of the Greek Catholic parish of the Holy Spirit. In 1922 she joined a Catholic monastic community. On 5 December 1923 she was arrested and, on 19 May 1922, she was sentenced under Art. 61 Criminal Code of the Russian Federation to five years in a concentration camp.

In 1930, she was released and sent to live three years in Saratov. In 1933, she returned to Leningrad and  worked in a tuberculosis clinic. Nefedeva was arrested again on 16 September 1935 on charges of participating in a counterrevolutionary organization. On 7 February 1936, she was sentenced under Article 58-10 of the Criminal Code of the RSFSR to three years' exile, and sent to Kargopol Arkhangelsk region. Her subsequent fate is unknown.

See also
Catholic Church in Russia

External links
Profile, Catholic.ru; accessed 5 October 2015.
Profile, biographies.library.nd.edu

Converts to Eastern Catholicism from Lutheranism
Russian Eastern Catholics
1870 births
Year of death unknown
Date of birth unknown
People from Pskov Oblast